The Love of d'Artagnan (Russian: «Любовь Д’Артаньяна», Lyobov D'Artanyana) is a 1971 comic opera by Mieczysław Weinberg set to a Russian libretto by Nora Gal, after The Three Musketeers of Dumas. It was the third of Weinberg's first three operas, all of which were praised by his friend and protector Shostakovich.

References

1971 operas
Compositions by Mieczysław Weinberg
Russian-language operas
Operas based on novels
Operas
Operas based on works by Alexandre Dumas
Works based on The Three Musketeers